Admiral Sir Hugh Pigot  (1775 – 29 July 1857) was an officer of the Royal Navy, who served in the French Revolutionary and Napoleonic Wars, and the War of 1812.

Biography

Early life and career
He was born the illegitimate son of George Pigot, 1st Baron Pigot (1719–1777), and Catherine Hill, and was thus a nephew of Lieutenant-General Robert Pigot and Admiral Hugh Pigot, and a cousin of General Henry Pigot and the notorious Captain Hugh Pigot. His brothers Richard and George both had distinguished careers in the army, rising to the rank of general and major respectively.

Pigot entered the Navy on 1 May 1788, first serving aboard the 50-gun fourth-rate ship , under the command of Captain Erasmus Gower, and the flagship of Rear-Admiral John Elliot, Commodore-Governor of Newfoundland. Later in the year he moved into the sloop , Captain Edward Pakenham. In 1792 he sailed for the Mediterranean aboard the 50-gun , flagship of Rear-Admiral Samuel Granston Goodall, who he followed into the 98-gun ship  in May 1793.

Following the evacuation of Toulon in December 1793, he was appointed acting-lieutenant of the 74-gun , Captain Andrew Sutherland (mariner), then served for a short period as midshipman in the Princess Royal, and in the 100-gun , flagship of Admiral William Hotham. He was officially promoted to lieutenant on 12 November 1794 to serve aboard the sloop , under the Captains the Honourable Henry Hotham, Shuldham Peard, and Edwards. In those ships he served in the Mediterranean, Newfoundland, the North Sea, Baltic, and Jamaica stations.

Post-captain
On 27 March 1805 Pigot commissioned the sloop  at Sheerness, but remained in her only for three months.
He commanded the sixth rate , and then from 28 June 1806 the 32-gun fifth-rate , both in the West Indies. On 5 April 1807 Circe captured the French privateer Austerlitz of 18 guns and 125 men. He commanded the 74-gun  and then the frigate , on the same station, and commanded the blockading squadron off Guadeloupe at the start of 1809 in the latter ship. On 10 February 1809, Latona assisted in the capture of French frigate Junon, of 46 guns and 323 men, whose fire wounded six of Latonas crew. The exertions and activity Pigot displayed in erecting jury-masts, and putting the prize into a seaworthy state, gained  him the warm official thanks of the senior officer present, Captain George Scott, of the Horatio.

Pigot then moved into the frigate , in which he spent the next four years stationed in the West Indies and at Halifax. In her, during the War of 1812 against the United States, he destroyed the 8-gun letter of marque Wampoe on 28 April 1813, and the 20-gun privateer Holkar on 11 May 1813. From the end of 1814 he commanded the 50-gun , and then the frigate , on the coast of North America, before returning to England in August 1815.

Post-war career and honours
He was made a Companion of the Order of the Bath (CB) on 26 September 1831, and in 1834 made a Knight Commander of the Royal Guelphic Order (KCH) and at the same time a Knight Bachelor. He was promoted to rear-admiral on 10 January 1837. From 16 May 1844 to 1 July 1847 Pigot was Commander-in-Chief on the Cork Station. He was made a Knight Commander of the Order of the Bath on 8 July 1847, and was promoted to vice-admiral on 6 August 1847. and was promoted to admiral on 4 July 1853. He retired to Chieveley in Berkshire and died on 29 July 1857.

See also

References

1775 births
1857 deaths
Royal Navy personnel of the French Revolutionary Wars
Royal Navy personnel of the Napoleonic Wars
Royal Navy personnel of the War of 1812
Royal Navy admirals
Knights Commander of the Order of the Bath
Knights Bachelor
People from Chieveley